"Face of a Man" is an Australian TV play by Richard Benyon, best known for writing The Shifting Heart who was living in England working as story editor on Z Cars.

Premise
A no-hoper steals a religious statue.

Cast
 John Meillon as Wally Sillerish
 Lyndall Rowe

Reception
The Canberra Times called it "extremely disappointing."

References

External links
 

1970s Australian television plays
1970 television plays
1970 Australian television episodes
Australian Plays (season 2) episodes